Pyropteron koschwitzi is a moth of the family Sesiidae. It is found in Spain and Portugal.

The larvae feed on Limonium species, including Limonium toledense and Limonium toletanum.

References

Moths described in 1992
Sesiidae